Thon Marial Maker (born 25 February 1997) is a South Sudanese-Australian professional basketball player for the Fujian Sturgeons of the Chinese Basketball Association (CBA). He attended high school at Orangeville District Secondary School and played basketball for Canada's Athlete Institute. He was picked 10th overall in the 2016 NBA draft, and played for three different NBA teams between 2016 and 2021.

Early life
Maker was born in Wau, a city located in what is now South Sudan. His uncle, a local administrator, arranged for Maker, his younger brother, Matur, and his aunt to escape the civil war to Uganda. From there, they were accepted as refugees by Australia; they then moved to Perth, Western Australia when Maker was five years of age and the family eventually settled down.

When he was 14, Maker was discovered playing soccer in the Perth suburb of Mirrabooka, by Edward Smith, an Australian of African-American heritage who helped children from migrant backgrounds receive opportunities they otherwise wouldn't get. Smith had previously helped fellow South Sudanese immigrants Ater Majok and Mathiang Muo, now both professional basketball players. Smith offered his aunt to feed, clothe and educate Maker in Sydney where Maker played basketball for the St. George Basketball Association during 2011. Just before the team's playoffs, Maker and Smith left to attend a talent camp in Texas.

High school career

Once in the United States, Maker attended two schools in Louisiana, including Metairie Park Country Day School, before finally settling down at Carlisle School in Martinsville, Virginia. During his freshman and sophomore years playing for Carlisle's varsity team, Maker averaged 22.2 points, 13.1 rebounds, 1.9 assists, 1.4 steals and 4.5 blocks over a total of 53 games. As a sophomore, he earned 2013–14 Gatorade Virginia Boys Basketball Player of the Year honours after leading Carlisle to a state championship.

On 5 September 2014, Maker and his brother enrolled at the Athlete Institute in Mono, Ontario where Edward Smith was already an assistant coach. In conjunction with the Athlete Institute, the brothers enrolled at Orangeville District Secondary School in the nearby town of Orangeville. On 29 December 2014, Maker scored 16 points and 9 rebounds in a 79–75 win over Dennis Smith Jr. and Trinity Christian School. On 30 December 2014, Maker scored 24 points and 11 rebounds as his team loss to Harry Giles and Wesleyan Christian Academy in the championship game of the High School OT Holiday Invitational tournament.

On 18 February 2015, Maker announced his decision to reclassify into the 2015 class, which would have made 2014–15 his final year of high school. He later participated in the 2015 Nike Hoop Summit in Portland, Oregon. Playing alongside fellow Australian Ben Simmons in the April 11 game, Maker recorded 10 rebounds, two points and one block as the World Team defeated Team USA, 103–101.

On 18 June 2015, Maker announced his decision to remain in the Class of 2016, and returned to Orangeville Prep for the 2015–16 season. Maker noted how stressful it was working toward entering the Class of 2015, with the issue centred on his workload and the pressure with "trying to get it all done at once". He was being recruited by Arizona State, Florida State, Indiana, Kansas, Kentucky, Notre Dame, St. John's and UNLV. On 21 June 2015, Maker was named MVP at the National Basketball Player's Association Top 100 camp.

On 3 April 2016, Maker declared his intentions to enter the 2016 NBA draft, a decision that required a ruling from the NBA to determine his eligibility. To skip a year of college, Maker had to convince the NBA he graduated from Orangeville Prep in 2015. He successfully did so, proving he graduated from high school in June 2015 but elected to stay for a postgraduate year, fulfilling both the minimum age and one year removed requirements to the NBA's satisfaction. With a successful ruling, Maker became just the second player in more than a decade to make the leap from high school in North America straight to the draft and the first to play in the NBA since the league introduced the "one-and-done" rule for high school students in 2005.

Coming out of high school, Maker was considered a five-star recruit by most basketball recruiting services.

Professional career

NBA draft
In the days leading up to the draft, a number of teams ruled themselves out of selecting Maker in the first round over concerns that his age had been misrepresented, as some believed Maker to be between 21–23 years of age despite being officially listed as a 19-year-old. Despite those concerns, he was selected with the 10th overall pick in the 2016 draft by the Milwaukee Bucks, becoming the first high school player taken in the first round since the 2005 Collective Bargaining Agreement went into effect.

Milwaukee Bucks (2016–2019)
During the 2016 NBA Summer League, Maker averaged 14.2 points and 9.6 rebounds in five games for the Bucks and subsequently earned All-NBA Summer League Second Team honours. On 30 July 2016, he signed his rookie scale contract with the Bucks. Maker made his NBA debut on 30 October 2016, entering the game with 95 seconds remaining in the final term of the Bucks' 98–83 loss to the Detroit Pistons; he recorded one rebound. On 21 January 2017, he made his first start for the Bucks and subsequently had six points in 18 minutes in a 109–97 loss to the Miami Heat. On 1 February 2017, he scored a season-high 12 points in a 104–88 loss to the Utah Jazz. On 10 February 2017, in the Bucks' first game since Jabari Parker was ruled out for the rest of the season with an ACL injury, Maker started in Parker's place and recorded seven points and six rebounds in 17 minutes in a 122–114 loss to the Los Angeles Lakers. The following day, he had a second 12-point effort in a 116–100 win over the Indiana Pacers. On 31 March 2017, he scored a career-high 23 points in a 108–105 overtime win over the Detroit Pistons.

On 22 November 2017, Maker scored a season-high 16 points against the Phoenix Suns. On 1 January 2018, he tied his season high with 16 points against the Toronto Raptors. In game 3 of the Bucks' first-round playoff series against the Boston Celtics, Maker scored 14 points and blocked five shots, as the Bucks cut the series deficit to 2–1 with a 116–92 win. He again blocked five shots in game 4, helping the Bucks even the series at 2–2 with a 104–102 win. The Bucks went on to lose the series in seven games.

On 7 January 2019, Maker had a season-high 15 points off the bench in a 114–102 win over the Jazz. By late January, having had a reduced role in 2018–19 under new coach Mike Budenholzer, Maker reportedly requested a trade from the Bucks.

Detroit Pistons (2019–2020)
On 7 February 2019, Maker was acquired by the Detroit Pistons in a three-team trade involving the Bucks and New Orleans Pelicans. On 22 February, he sank a tiebreaking 3-pointer with 16.7 seconds remaining to lift the Pistons to a 125–122 win over the Atlanta Hawks. It was announced on 19 November 2020 that Pistons general manager Troy Weaver opted to not extend Maker a qualifying offer, allowing him to become a free agent.

Cleveland Cavaliers (2020–2021)
On 30 November 2020, Maker signed a training camp contract with the Cleveland Cavaliers. He played eight games for the Cavaliers in the 2020–21 season, scoring 30 points and collecting 18 rebounds, before being waived on 13 January 2021.

Hapoel Jerusalem (2021)
On 25 August 2021, Maker signed a deal with Hapoel Jerusalem of the Israeli Basketball Premier League. He parted ways with the team on 12 December, after averaging 2.8 points and 3.5 rebounds per game.

Long Island Nets (2022)
On 21 January 2022, Maker was acquired via available player pool by the Long Island Nets.

Fujian Sturgeons (2022–present) 
On 28 July 2022, Maker signed with the Fujian Sturgeons.

National team career
In April 2015, Maker declared his intentions to play for the Australian national team despite heavy interest from Basketball Canada—the organisation had considered Maker and his younger brother Matur as potential Canadian players. On 29 June 2018, he made his international debut for Australia in a FIBA World Cup qualifier against Japan. Maker was involved in the Philippines–Australia basketball brawl during the 2019 FIBA Basketball World Cup Asian qualification. As a result, he was suspended for three games.

Career statistics

NBA

Regular season

|-
| style="text-align:left;"| 
| style="text-align;left;"| Milwaukee
| 57 || 34 || 9.9 || .459 || .378 || .653 || 2.0 || .4 || .2 || .5 || 4.0
|-
| style="text-align:left;"| 
| style="text-align;left;"| Milwaukee
| 74 || 12 || 16.7 || .411 || .298 || .699 || 3.0 || .6 || .5 || .7 || 4.8
|-
| style="text-align:left;" rowspan="2"| 
| style="text-align:left;"| Milwaukee
| 35 || 0 || 11.7 || .440 || .333 || .541 || 2.7 || .5 || .3 || .5 || 4.7
|-
| style="text-align:left;"| Detroit
| 29 || 5 || 19.4 || .373 || .307 || .766 || 3.7 || .9 || .4 || 1.1 || 5.5
|-
| style="text-align:left;"| 
| style="text-align:left;"| Detroit
| 60 || 14 || 12.9 || .482 || .344 || .664 || 2.8 || .7 || .4 || .7 || 4.7
|-
| style="text-align:left;"| 
| style="text-align:left;"| Cleveland
| 8 || 0 || 9.5 || .556 || .000 || .909 || 2.3 || .5 || .3 || .5 || 3.8
|- class="sortbottom"
| style="text-align:center;" colspan="2"| Career
| 263 || 65 || 13.8 || .435 || .327 || .680 || 2.8 || .6 || .4 || .7 || 4.6

Playoffs

|-
| style="text-align:left;"| 2017
| style="text-align:left;"| Milwaukee
| 6 || 6 || 19.3 || .387 || .200 || .818 || 3.2 || 2.0 || .8 || 1.8 || 5.8
|-
| style="text-align:left;"| 2018
| style="text-align:left;"| Milwaukee
| 6 || 2 || 21.7 || .393 || .300 || .714 || 3.8 || .8 || .3 || 1.8 || 5.5
|-
| style="text-align:left;"| 2019
| style="text-align:left;"| Detroit
| 4 || 2 || 17.3 || .269 || .000 || .889 || 2.3 || 1.0 || 0.0 || 1.0 || 5.5
|- class="sortbottom"
| style="text-align:center;" colspan="2"| Career
| 16 || 10 || 19.7 || .353 || .190 || .815 || 3.2 || 1.3 || .4 || 1.6 || 5.6

Personal life
Maker is an Australian and South Sudanese citizen.

Maker's parents, who descend from the Dinka people, still live in South Sudan and are also both very tall; his father stands  and his mother stands . His brother, Matur, attempted to enter the 2018 NBA draft in a manner similar to Thon before deciding to play internationally instead. Another brother, Maker Maker, plays soccer for South Melbourne FC's under-20 team. He has another cousin, Makur, who currently plays basketball for Howard University. Another cousin, Aliir Aliir, plays in the Australian Football League for Port Adelaide. In March 2018, Maker confirmed he supported the Sydney Swans due to Aliir playing for them at the time, despite previously supporting the two West Australian teams.

There are conspiracy theories that Maker is actually four years older than what is on his official passport, that Maker had actually graduated from Aranmore Catholic College, a high school in Perth, Australia, back in 2010 before enrolling again in high school in Canada, and that Edward Smith had a hand in forging Maker's official paperwork.

References

External links

Thon Maker at maxpreps.com
After long road, Maker adds intrigue to NBA Draft
Thon Maker Seeks To Be Part Of 2016 Draft
Thon Maker Exclusive Post NBA Draft Decision Interview

1997 births
Living people
Australian expatriate basketball people in Canada
Australian expatriate basketball people in the United States
South Sudanese emigrants to Australia
Sportspeople of South Sudanese descent
Australian men's basketball players
Basketball players from Perth, Western Australia
Basketball players from Sydney
Centers (basketball)
Cleveland Cavaliers players
Detroit Pistons players
Dinka people
Hapoel Jerusalem B.C. players
Long Island Nets players
Milwaukee Bucks draft picks
Milwaukee Bucks players
National Basketball Association high school draftees
Power forwards (basketball)
Sportsmen from New South Wales
South Sudanese men's basketball players
South Sudanese refugees
Refugees in Uganda
Australian expatriate basketball people in Israel
Australian expatriate basketball people in China
Sportsmen from Western Australia